Meandu Creek Dam is a dam built near Yarraman in Queensland, Australia. The Tarong and Tarong North Power Stations source water from the Brisbane River catchment via a pipeline from Wivenhoe Dam. Cooling tower blowdown water is either discharged directly to Tarong Energy's Meandu Creek Dam or supplied to the nearby Tarong Mine owned by Rio Tinto Coal Australia. Excess water from the mine is discharged back to Meandu Creek Dam. Releases from Meandu Creek Dam supply downstream irrigators on Meandu Creek. In 2019 Stanwell Corporation temporarily stopped discharges into the creek to allow downstream property owners to repair culverts.

The dam has a full storage capacity of 3,000 megalitres covering an area of 69 hectares, and a catchment area of 3,970 hectares.

See also

List of dams and reservoirs in Australia

References

External links
 Tarong Energy

Reservoirs in Queensland
Wide Bay–Burnett
Dams in Queensland